Toran may refer to:
 Torana, a free-standing ornamental or arched gateway in Hindu, Buddhist and Jain architecture
 Toran (art), a decorative door hanging
 Toran (Pashtun tribe)
 Taro, a tropical plant

See also
 Turan (disambiguation)